Apparition may refer to:

Supernatural 
Apparitional experience, an anomalous, quasi-perceptual experience
 A vision, something seen in a dream, trance, or religious ecstasy
Ghost, the soul or spirit of a dead person or animal that can appear to the living
Doppelgänger, the ghostly double of a living person
Bilocation, the ability to be in two places at once

Media

Music
Apparition (EP), 2009, by The Contortionist
Apparition (The Legendary Pink Dots album), 1982
"Apparitions" (song), 1998, by Matthew Good Band
"Apparition", a 2006 song by Canadian band Delerium on their album Nuages du Monde
"Apparition", composition by Vladimír Hirsch, from the album (soundtrack) "Markéta, the daughter of Lazar", 2010
"The Apparition", a song by Beyond The Bridge
"The Apparition", a song from Iron Maiden's 1992 album Fear of the Dark
Apparition (Jambinai EP), 2022

Film
The Apparition (1903 film), a silent comedy
The Apparition (2012 film), a 2012 supernatural horror film
The Apparition (2018 film), a drama

Other media
Apparition (company), a former U.S. film distribution company
Apparition (Harry Potter), a fictional form of teleportation
Apparitions (TV series), a 2008 BBC series about an exorcist
Phantom Girl (also known as Apparition Girl), a DC Comics superheroine
Apparitions, an orchestral work by György Ligeti
Apparitions, a 1936 ballet choreographed by Sir Frederick Ashton with music by Franz Liszt

Other uses
 Apparition Mountain, Alberta, Canada
 Apparition, the appearance of a comet

See also 
 Marian apparition, a supernatural experience involving the Virgin Mary
 Apparitional (film), a 2013 horror film
Apparition of Face and Fruit Dish on a Beach, a 1938 painting by Salvador Dalí
 Appearance (disambiguation)
 Demonic possession
 Eidolon (disambiguation)
 Ghost (disambiguation)
 Phantom (disambiguation)